Shane Johnson may refer to:
Shane Johnson (actor) (born 1976), American actor
Shane Johnson (author), now Lora Johnson, American author
Shane Johnson (ice hockey) (born 1974), ice hockey player 
Shane Johnson (soccer) (born 1989), defender for the Harrison City Islanders
Shane Johnson (triathlete), Australian triathlete, see 1992 ITU Triathlon World Championships